OEN may refer to:
 Old East Norse, a language
 Old English Newsletter, an academic journal
 OpEdNews, a progressive or liberal opinion-based website
 Oregon Entrepreneurs Network
 Alexander Dale Oen (1985-2012), Norwegian Olympic swimming hopeful